Inauguration of Barack Obama may refer to:

 First inauguration of Barack Obama, 2009
 Second inauguration of Barack Obama, 2013